Parrotsville is a former settlement in Tipton County and Hamilton County in Indiana in the United States.

History

Parrotsville was surveyed by Edward M. Sharp on September 29, 1853. It was platted a few days later on October 5. Parrotsville was about a 1/2 mile south of Jackson Station, Indiana. Benjaman F. Goar handled sales of the Parrotsville land.

References

Geography of Tipton County, Indiana
Former populated places in Indiana